Năvodari (historical names: Carachioi; Caracoium) is a town in Constanța County, region of Northern Dobruja, Romania, with a population of 32,400. The town formally includes a territorially distinct community, Social Group Peninsula, and administers the neighbouring village of Mamaia-Sat.

Etymology

The name of the town means "trawlers" in Romanian.

History

The settlement was mentioned for the first time in 1421 under the name Kara Koyun ("Black Sheep"), to be renamed later on Karaköy or Carachioi ("The Black Village"). In 1927, the locality was again renamed to Năvodari and after five years, on 15 August 1932, it was granted commune status.

The town developed during the communist regime as part of the industrialization program. In 1957, the superphosphate and sulfuric acid plant, also known as USAS (Uzina de Superfosfat si Acid Sulfuric, Superphosphate and Sulfuric Acid Factory), whose construction had started in 1954, was opened, paving the road towards the industrialization of the area and demographic growth. However, the factory polluted the Black Sea and Lake Tașaul with toxic dumps. In the 1990s, the pollution was greatly reduced as the factory was modernized.

In 1968 the population of Năvodari exceeded 6,500 inhabitants. A law adopted that year granted the commune of Năvodari town status and placed the Mamaia Sat village under its administration. The modernization of the town began in 1975 and was completed on 29 June 1979.

Current status
Today Năvodari is an important chemical and industrial town featuring a car repairs factory and a Petromidia factory specialized in petrochemical products.

Năvodari has also developed in the social and cultural fields; in the city center there is a children's town, built between 1969 and 1972, vacation accommodations, and sports facilities where up to 12,000 visitors can be accommodated.

Some  from the town itself there is a summer camp (the largest one in Romania), built under the communist regime for school children. Due to its interesting programmes, good accommodation and affordable prices, it was extremely popular among teachers and parents. In the early 2000s, it was opened for the public at large as a cheap seaside resort.

Demographics

At the 2011 census, the population of Năvodari consisted of 29,873 ethnic Romanians (94.67%), 283 Hungarians (0.90%), 309 Roma (0.98%), 10 Germans (0.03%), 297 Turks (0.94%), 115 Tatars (0.36%), 545 Lipovans (1.73%), 27 Aromanians (0.09%), 77 others (0.24%), and 18 with undeclared ethnicity (0.06%).

Notable natives
 (b. 1976), member of the 3rei Sud Est band
Adrian Lungu (b. 1960), Romania's most capped rugby union player

References

External links
 

Towns in Romania
Monotowns in Romania
Populated places in Constanța County
Localities in Northern Dobruja
Populated coastal places in Romania
Port cities and towns in Romania
Port cities of the Black Sea
Socialist planned cities